In mathematics, extendible cardinals are large cardinals introduced by , who was partly motivated by reflection principles.  Intuitively, such a cardinal represents a point beyond which initial pieces of the universe of sets start to look similar, in the sense that each is elementarily embeddable into a later one.

Definition
For every ordinal η, a cardinal κ is called η-extendible if  for some ordinal λ there is a nontrivial elementary embedding j of Vκ+η into Vλ, where κ is the critical point of j, and as usual Vα denotes the αth level of the von Neumann hierarchy.  A cardinal κ is called an extendible cardinal if it is η-extendible for every nonzero ordinal η (Kanamori 2003).

Properties
(The usual compactness theorem shows -compactness of first-order logic.) Let  be the infinitary logic for second-order set theory, permitting infinitary conjunctions and disjunctions of length .  is extendible iff  is -compact.

Variants and relation to other cardinals
A cardinal κ is called η-C(n)-extendible if there is an elementary embedding j witnessing that κ is η-extendible (that is, j is elementary from Vκ+η to some Vλ with critical point κ) such that furthermore, Vj(κ) is Σn-correct in V.  That is, for every Σn formula φ, φ holds in Vj(κ) if and only if φ holds in V.  A cardinal κ is said to be C(n)-extendible if it is η-C(n)-extendible for every ordinal η.  Every extendible cardinal is C(1)-extendible, but for n≥1, the least C(n)-extendible cardinal is never C(n+1)-extendible (Bagaria 2011).

Vopěnka's principle implies the existence of extendible cardinals; in fact, Vopěnka's principle (for definable classes) is equivalent to the existence of C(n)-extendible cardinals for all n (Bagaria 2011).  All extendible cardinals are supercompact cardinals (Kanamori 2003).

See also
List of large cardinal properties
Reinhardt cardinal

References

Large cardinals